Paul van Ostaijen (22 February 1896 – 18 March 1928) was a Belgian Dutch-language poet and writer.

Nickname
Van Ostaijen was born in Antwerp to Dutch father and Flemish mother.  His nickname was Mister 1830, derived from his habit of walking along the streets of Antwerp clothed as a dandy from that year.

His poetry shows influences from Modernism, Expressionism, Dadaism and early Surrealism, but Van Ostaijen's style is very much his own.

Flamingant
Van Ostaijen was an active flamingant, a supporter of Flemish independence. Because of his involvement with Flemish activism during World War I, he had to flee to Berlin after the war. In Berlin—one of the centers of Dadaism and Expressionism—he met many other artists. He also struggled through a severe mental crisis.

Upon returning to Belgium, Van Ostaijen opened an art gallery in Brussels. He died of tuberculosis in 1928 in a sanatorium in Miavoye-Anthée, in the Wallonian Ardennes.

The Czech poet Ivan Wernisch was so impressed by "the genius of van Ostaijen" that he learned Dutch to be able to translate him. His translation was published as Tanec gnómů, Dance of the gnomes, in 1990.

Poetry

 Music hall (1916)
 Het sienjaal (The signal, 1918)
 Bezette stad (Occupied city, 1921)
 Feesten van Angst en Pijn (Feasts of Fear and Pain, written 1921, published posthumously)
 Nagelaten gedichten (Posthumous poems, published posthumously in 1928)

Other publications
 De trust der vaderlandsliefde (The trust of patriotism, 1925, grotesques)
 Gebruiksaanwijzing der lyriek (Manual of lyrics, 1926, lecture)
 Het bordeel van Ika Loch (Ika Loch's brothel, 1926, grotesques)
 De bende van de stronk (The stump gang, 1932, grotesques)

See also

 Flemish literature

References

External links
Nagelaten gedichten
Short biography
Dandy en dichter
Sonja A.J. Neef: Kalligramme. Zur Medialität einer Schrift. Anhand von Paul van Ostaijens "De feesten van angst en pijn". Amsterdam: ASCA Press 2000
 

1896 births
1928 deaths
20th-century deaths from tuberculosis
Flemish poets
Writers from Antwerp
Flemish activists
Tuberculosis deaths in Belgium
20th-century Belgian poets
Dada